Belyakov or Belyakova (Белякова; feminine), is a Russian surname, also transliterated as Beliakov and Beliakoff. It may refer to:

 Aleksandr Belyakov (born 1962), Soviet luger
 Alexander Semyonovich Belyakov (born 1945), Russian politician
 Alexander Vasilyevich Belyakov (1897-1982), Soviet aviator
 Boris Belyakov, (1927-?), Soviet fencer
 Gennady Belyakov (born 1968), Soviet luger
 Oleg Belyakov (born 1972), Russian football player
 Valeri Belyakov (born 1953), Soviet hockey player
 Vladimir Belyakov (1918-1996), Soviet gymnast
 Yelena Belyakova (born 1976), Russian pole vaulter

Russian-language surnames